Slim Chickens is a fast-casual restaurant chain which specializes in chicken tenders, wings, sandwiches, salads, wraps, chicken and waffles, and other items. It was founded in 2003 by Greg Smart and Tom Gordon.

History 
The first location opened in 2003 at 2120 N. College Avenue in Fayetteville, Arkansas, inside a building formerly home to a sushi restaurant. In 2005, the second location opened in the nearby city of Rogers. The chain's expansion accelerated in 2008 with five more company-owned locations opening in Arkansas and Oklahoma. In 2013, the first franchise location was opened in Texarkana by businessman Greg McKay. The next year, six regional franchise deals were made.

The company has since expanded with more than 100 locations in 19 states, with international locations in the UK and Kuwait. The 100th location opened in Little Rock on December 18, 2020.

Menu 
The Slim Chickens menu focuses on fresh chicken tenders, wings, salads, sandwiches, wraps, chicken and waffles, and southern-fried sides like pickles, okra, and fried mushrooms.

In addition the restaurant offers seasonal items like tender mac and cheese, buffalo mac, strawberry salads, and seasonal drinks like cranberry lemonade, strawberry lemonade, and others.

Slim Chickens also serves desserts in Mason jars, including a strawberry cheesecake dessert, a chocolate brownie, along with other seasonal flavors.

10 Point Capital and 600 Restaurant Goal 
Slim Chickens in 2019 announced a minority investment by 10 Point Capital, a company that helped fuel major expansions for companies like Tropical Smoothie Cafe and others. CEO Tom Gordon said the investment would help the company toward its stated goal of opening 600 locations in the next 10 years.

International expansion 
In a partnership with Persian Gulf company Alghanim Industries, the first international Slim Chickens opened in Salmiya, Kuwait, in May 2017. A London branch opened at 35 James Street in March 2018. A Cardiff branch opened in St David's Dewi Sant in 2019. A Bristol UK branch opened in 2019 in the shopping area of Cabot Circus. A branch of this restaurant chain opened in Birmingham, UK.

The first branch in Kent, England, opened in Bluewater Shopping Centre in February 2020.
Since then, in 2021, two new openings within Bournemouth and Southampton have taken place in the south coast of England, UK.

References

Fayetteville, Arkansas
Chicken chains of the United States
American companies established in 2003
Restaurants established in 2003
2003 establishments in Arkansas
Companies based in Arkansas
Arkansas culture